Sebastian Jones may refer to:

 Sebastian Jones (television producer), American television producer and writer
 Sebastian Graham Jones (1947–2014), British actor and director
 Sebastian LaMar Jones (born 1986), American record producer, songwriter and DJ
 Sebastian Jones (filmmaker), American film director, screenwriter, and editor